Turkish Deaf Sport Federation is the official national sport governing body of deaf sports in Turkey.

The Turkish Deaf Sport Federation was formed in 1957 and it is affiliated with the Comite International des Sports des Sourds (CISS). The national Deaf Sport Federation is also a member organisation of European Deaf Sports Organization.

The Federation is responsible for sending, funding, supporting Deaf sportspeople representing Turkey at the Deaflympics and in other Deaf Championships, and has sent deaf sportspeople to represent Turkey at the Deaflympics since 1961.

2017 Summer Deaflympics 
The Turkish Deaf Sport Federation was instrumental in hosting the 2017 Summer Deaflympics in Samsun (Turkey), which was also the largest ever Deaflympics event to be held in any nation. This was also the first occasion where Turkey had hosted a Deaflympic event.

Following the event, the President of the Deaf Sport Federation, Yakup Ümit Kihter thanked the officials who assisted in staging the 2017 Summer Deaflympics in Turkey. He also mentioned that events like Deaflympics would definitely help to improve the quality of sports in Turkey.

See also 
Turkey at the Deaflympics

References

See also 
 Turkey at the 2017 Summer Deaflympics
 List of sports governing bodies in Turkey

Parasports in Turkey
Disability organizations based in Turkey
Deaf sport
Deaf culture in Turkey
Deaf sports organizations